Michael Etulain Castro (born October 31, 1980) is a Uruguayan football player, who plays for Danubio FC. He was born in Montevideo, Uruguay. He plays as a goalkeeper.

Teams
  Danubio 1999–2004
  Oriente Petrolero 2005
  Unión de Santa Fe 2006
  Defensor Sporting 2006
  Portimonense 2007–2008
  Ferro Carril Oeste 2009
  Miramar Misiones 2010
  Oriente Petrolero 2011
  Talleres de Cordoba 2011–2012
  Sarmiento 2012–2013

References

External links
 

1980 births
Living people
Uruguayan footballers
Uruguayan expatriate footballers
Danubio F.C. players
Defensor Sporting players
Unión de Santa Fe footballers
Ferro Carril Oeste footballers
Miramar Misiones players
Oriente Petrolero players
Talleres de Córdoba footballers
Cúcuta Deportivo footballers
Uruguayan Primera División players
Expatriate footballers in Argentina
Expatriate footballers in Bolivia
Expatriate footballers in Portugal
Uruguayan expatriate sportspeople in Portugal
Uruguayan expatriate sportspeople in Colombia
Association football goalkeepers

Uruguayan sportspeople of Italian descent